Uzair-ul-Haq (born 15 April 1986) is a Pakistani first-class cricketer who played for Karachi cricket team.

References

External links
 

1986 births
Living people
Pakistani cricketers
Karachi cricketers
Place of birth missing (living people)